The Executive Council of Mpumalanga is the cabinet of the executive branch of the provincial government in the South African province of Mpumalanga. The Members of the Executive Council (MECs) are appointed from among the members of the Mpumalanga Provincial Legislature by the Premier of Mpumalanga, an office held since March 2018 by Refilwe Mtsweni-Tsipane.

Makwetla premiership: 2004–2009 
On 3 May 2004, Thabang Makwetla, who was elected Premier of Mpumalanga in the 2004 general election, announced his new Executive Council. Cabinet reshuffles were announced in January 2005 and February 2007. A final, major reshuffle was announced in May 2008, after the 52nd National Conference of the governing African National Congress (ANC) and ahead of the provincial elective conference of the ANC in Mpumalanga.

Mabuza premiership

First term: 2009–2014 
On 12 May 2009, after his election in the 2009 general election, new Mpumalanga Premier David Mabuza announced his new Executive Council, including the restructuring of the local government and housing portfolio and the merger of the public works portfolio with roads and transport. His first reshuffle was announced on 3 November 2010, and on 19 July 2011 he announced that the MEC for Public Works, Roads and Transport, Clifford Mkasi, would swap portfolios with the MEC for Health and Social Development, Dikeledi Mahlangu. On 18 February 2013, in another reshuffle, Mabuza fired Mkasi and two other MECs, Siphosezwe Masango and Norman Mokoena.

Second term: 2014–present 
On 30 May 2014, after his re-election in the 2014 general election, Mabuza announced his new Executive Council, restructuring several departments. In August 2016, after the 2016 local government elections, he announced a reshuffle.

Mtsweni-Tsipane premiership

First term: 2018–present 
In March 2018, Refilwe Mtsweni-Tsipane was officially sworn in as Premier, replacing David Mabuza, who had become Deputy President of South Africa; Mtsweni-Tsipane announced a reshuffle shortly after her inauguration. In July 2017, Mtsweni-Tsipane announced that Health MEC Gillion Mashego would swop portfolios with Public Works MEC Sasekani Manzini; the announcement followed protests by the National Education, Health and Allied Workers' Union, which called for Mashego's dismissal.

Second term: 2019–present 
In the 2019 general election, Premier Mtsweni-Tsipane was elected to a full term as Premier and on 28 May 2019 she announced her new Executive Council. On 24 February 2021, she announced a reshuffle which removed four MECs, all viewed as political supporters of former Premier Mabuza. In October 2021, she also fired Mandla Msibi as MEC for Agriculture, Rural Development and Land Administration; Busisiwe Shiba, the MEC for Corporate Governance and Traditional Affairs, took over Msibi's portfolio in an acting capacity and then permanently in May 2022. Msibi returned to the Executive Council in an October 2022 reshuffle, which saw two other MECs fired.

See also 

 Template:Mpumalanga Executive Council
 Government of South Africa
 Constitution of South Africa

References 

Government of Mpumalanga